The Jabberwocks is the oldest a cappella group at Brown University.

History

The group began in 1949 as an offshoot of the traditional Men's Glee Club when four members decided to start their own independent singing group. In 1956, Brown Music Department chair Arlan Coolidge, frustrated that the group was getting bookings that would otherwise have gone to the Glee Club, referred to the Jabberwocks as "a misguided small group of students whose product is a type of vaudeville."
The original Jabberwocks, a double quartet, "wore grey flannel suits, white button-down oxford shirts, striped ties and white buck shoes, and travelled to out-of-town concerts in a 1928 Rolls-Royce."

The Chattertocks, a female a cappella group at the Pembroke women's college began as a parody of the Jabberwocks in 1952.

The Jabberwocks temporarily disappeared in 1975, was resurrected in 1980, and survived a brief period in the mid-1980s when some singers tried to take the group professional. Over the decades the group's repertoire has ranged from 1950s doo-wop, to Motown to contemporary pop.

For most of their history, the Jabberwocks were an all-male ensemble, with a brief co-ed period after Pembroke was merged into Brown in 1971. As of the fall of 2019, the group began accepting all genders and voices.

Awards
1993, Freedom '90 (song), Runner up, Best Male Collegiate Song
2006, International Championship of Collegiate A Cappella regional quarterfinals, second place
2010, International Championship of Collegiate A Cappella's Northeast semifinals, second place
2010, Breaking & Entering (album) nominated for the 2010 Contemporary A cappella Recording Awards in three categories.
2017, "Taking the Fall" (album) nominated for the 2017 Contemporary A cappella Recording Awards in three categories.

Notable alumni
 Keith Barbour, American singer-songwriter
 Kid Beyond, a singer, beat boxer and live looper based in the San Francisco area
 Harrison Chad, American theater, film, and television actor.
 Michael Weisman, actor, known for The Glee Project (2011), A.N.T. Farm (2011) and Hot in Cleveland (2010).
 Brian Cross, actor, known for originating the role of Arnold Gaesling in "The Snow Geese" on Broadway (2013).
 David Gockley, general director, San Francisco Opera
 James Naughton, American director, theater, film and television actor
 Andy Suzuki, American singer-songwriter

Albums
The Jabberwocks of 1953
Old rockin' chair
How high the moon
 Mood indigo
 Hello, young lovers
 Wade in the water
 Aba daba honeymoon
 Lindy Lou
 Water boy
 Never throw a lighted lamp at Mother
 Soon one mornin
 Halls of ivy
 Oh Joe

The Jabberwocks of 1956, Brown University
Be prepared
From this moment on
O Joe
Were you there?
Too good for the average man
On the chapel steps
Josephine
That old black magic
Steppin' around
Hello, young lovers
The farmer's daughter
Farewell song

Fascinatin' Rhythm (1958)
Fascinatin' rhythm
Autumn Leaves
From this moment on
Too darn hot
Dancing on the ceiling
Coventry carol
Halls of ivy
My ideal
Wonderful Copenhagen
Tea for two
Swing low
Good news
Farewell song

A peace of ourselves (1969)
Enter the young (2:24)
My old desk (2:15)
Medley: The guys' song; The worst that could happen; Orange air (6:53)
Hey Jude (6:46)
Obladi, oblada (3:05)
Never my love (2:56)
Mrs. Robinson (3:23)
Getting better (2:15)
Medley: The fiddle and the drum; Requiem for the masses (5:34)

Streetnight (1984)
Tuxedo Junction
Lean on me
Every time we say goodbye
Take you back
Some people
I'm gonna sit right down and write myself a letter
Me and the boys
Come go with me
Streetnight
Bright college days
Old black magic
Crocodile rock
Rhythm of the rain
You won't see me
Farewell song : traditional Brown song

Hangin' Out (1988)

Stylin' By the Tum-tum Tree (1990)

The Sharpest Tools in the Shed (1992)

Liz's Slingback Boots (1993–1994)
Intro
Me and the Boys
7
Just the Two of Us
Get into the Groove
The Sweetest Thing
Take Five
Never Tear Us Apart
Black Dog
Walking on the Moon
Wanna Be Startin' Somethin
I Will Survive
Why Should I Cry for You
Don't Stop Believin
Farewell Song

Woonsocket (1996) 
Don't You (Forget About Me) (04:30)
Sexual Healing (04:07)
How Come U Don't Call Me Anymore (03:51)
Lucy In The Sky With Diamonds (04:11)
She's Leaving Home (05:22)
With A Little Help From My Friends (02:32)
Don't Dream It's Over (03:53)
Me And The Boys (04:21)
Superman (02:51)
Vogue (05:58)
Blue Skies (01:20)
Farewell Song (01:57)

Sermons and Soda Water (1997–1998)
Me and the Boys (The Nylons)
Send Me On My Way (Rusted Root)
Change the World (Babyface, Eric Clapton)
Volare (Gipsy Kings)
Ribbon in the Sky (Stevie Wonder)
It's Still Rock and Roll to Me (Billy Joel)
Glory Days (Bruce Springsteen)
Ebony & Ivory (Stevie Wonder, Paul McCartney)
When We Dance (Sting)
Tempted (Squeeze)
Love Will Come to You (Indigo Girls)
All Night Long (Lionel Richie)
You're All I Need to Get By (Marvin Gaye)
Farewell Song (Brown Traditional)

The Jabberwocks: Fiftieth Anniversary Anthology (1949–1999)
Halls of Ivy (00:29)
Never Throw A Lighted Lamp at Mother (01:52)
Mood Indigo (01:58)
How High The Moon (01:31)
O Joe (01:44)
Fascinatin' Rhythm (01:51)
Old Black Magic (02:33)
Civil War (02:27)
Never My Love (02:52)
Come Go With Me (02:30)
Maine Girl (03:10)
Rock-N-Roll Lullaby (04:53)
Me and the Boys (03:57)
Freedom '90 (05:33)
7 (03:56)
How Come U Don't Call Me Anymore? (03:51)
Send Me On My Way (04:01)
Farewell Song (02:03)

Listening Session (2007)
Sympathy For the Devil (2:56)
Don't Let Me Be Misunderstood (4:00)
The Seed 3.0 (4:19)
Fix You (4:51)
Ben Folds (4:05)
The Last Time (2:54)
Feeling Good (3:31)
Tonight, Tonight (4:25)
Get By (5:16)
Farewell (1:48)
Blackbird (2:45)

Breaking & Entering (2009)
You Know My Name (4:14)
Ain't No Sunshine (3:36)
The World's Greatest (3:54)
Viva La Vida (3:47)
Apologize 3.0 (3:25)
Gone (3:17)
Don't You Worry 'bout a Thing (3:45)
3-Pain (4:26)
Higher Ground (3:55)
Bright Lights (3:56)
Dance With My Father (4:06)
I'd Do Anything for Love (5:58)
Farewell Song (1:42)

Jabbertalk (2013)
All of the Lights / Power' (2:37)Keep It Loose, Keep It Tight (2:50)Retrograde (3:54)This Woman's Work (3:44)Use Somebody" (4:13)
Ragged Wood (3:05)
Sweet Disposition (4:08)
Someone Like You / Set Fire to the Rain (5:53)
Mirrors (4:46)
With a Little Help From My Friends (4:08)
Farewell (1:44)

Taking the Fall (2016)
Sweater Weather (3:10)
Bad Blood (4:23)
Power Trip / Mine (3:48)
Me and Mrs. Jones (4:40)
Spider-Man (3:30)
Human Nature (4:04)
Stitches (3:33)
Brick (4:29)
Cry Me a River (4:27)
Drift Away (3:21)
Farewell (1:35)

Roommates (2019)

 Take on Me (3:30)
 If You Were The Rain (3:17)
 All I Ask (4:27)
 Finesse (3:26)
 Climax (4:29)
 No Me No You No More/Let Me Down (4:28)
 Death of a Bachelor (3:34)
 Sign of the Times (3:44)
 Always on My Mind (4:21)
 Farewell (1:34)

References

External links

Brown University organizations
Musical groups from Rhode Island
Collegiate a cappella groups
Musical groups established in 1949
1949 establishments in Rhode Island